Krasny Yar is a rural locality (a selo) and the administrative center of Krasnoyarsky Selsoviet of Sovetsky District, Altai Krai, Russia. The population was 1,203 in 2016. There are 19 streets.

Geography 
Krasny Yar is located 10 km north of Sovetskoye (the district's administrative centre) by road. Sovetskoye is the nearest rural locality.

References 

Rural localities in Sovetsky District, Altai Krai